Gračina Viewpoint is situated in Croatia, in the Municipality of Tisno, between Ivinj and Tisno. The viewpoint is 113 meters above sea level and there is a view of Tisno, Pirovac and Lake Vrana as well as the islands of Murter and Kornati. There is a television transmitter at the viewpoint.

References

Tourism in Croatia
Šibenik-Knin County
Scenic viewpoints
Outdoor structures in Croatia